McGee's Crossroads is an unincorporated community in Johnston County, North Carolina,  United States,  situated at the intersection of North Carolina Highway 50, and North Carolina Highway 210. It lies at an elevation of 292 feet (89 m).

The community of McGee's Crossroads extends to the intersection of I-40 and Hwy. 210, west to the town of Angier, and the intersection of 
Hwy. 50 and Hwy. 42.

The area is also known as the "50210" after the local fire department.

The area is also widely known as Willow Spring , for the post office that covers a majority of the area; as well as Black Creek, for a local water feature and church

References

Unincorporated communities in Johnston County, North Carolina
Unincorporated communities in North Carolina